German Naval Yards Holdings GmbH (GNYH) is a German shipyard group which combines three shipyards in the Kieler Förde under its umbrella: German Naval Yards Kiel, Nobiskrug (Rendsburg) and  (Kiel).

The group is a 100% subsidiary of Privinvest, a European shipyard group which also owns other naval companies such as CMN in France and Isherwoods in Great Britain.

In 2014, the GNYH shipyards generated a turnover of approx. 250 million euros with about 1,000 employees.

Overview
German Naval Yards Holdings is active in two main business fields: German Naval Yards Kiel (GNY Kiel) specialises in the design and construction of large naval vessels, such as frigates, corvettes and offshore patrol vessels; whereas Nobiskrug is a leading super-yacht builder. The Lindenau shipyard focuses on repair and maintenance services.

Under the umbrella of GNYH, the three neighbouring shipyards operate under joint management and administration with the aim to use their facilities complementarily. GNY Kiel possesses the largest dry dock in the Baltic Sea region (426 meters length) as well as a crane with a lifting weight of up to 900 tons. Nobiskrug uses a dock hall with a length of 160 meters and a dry dock with a length of 200 meters. The Lindenau shipyard has 480 meters of jetty facilities.

History
German Naval Yards Holdings carries on a long shipbuilding tradition in the Kiel fjord. The foundation for the German shipyard group was laid in 2009, when Privinvest purchased Nobiskrug, at the time realised via the Abu Dhabi MAR Holding. The Rendsburg-based shipyard, founded in 1905, is specialised in the construction of individually manufactured superyachts of more than 60 meters length.

In 2011, the group acquired GNY Kiel. The roots of GNY Kiel lie in the civil vessel activities of Howaldtswerke-Deutsche Werft. It also has a long naval tradition as all frigate classes currently operated by the German navy were built at this yard. GNY Kiel formerly operated under the names of HDW Gaarden and ADM Kiel. Altogether the yard has a history of more than 175 years, beginning with the first predecessor company Schweffel & Howaldt in 1838.

In 2013, Privinvest purchased the Lindenau shipyard in Kiel, which had become insolvent. Lindenau was founded in 1919 as “Schiffswerft Memel - Lindenau & Cie.” in East Prussia and was rebuilt in Kiel-Friedrichsort after World War II. Within the GNYH group, Lindenau today focusses on repair and maintenance.

In 2014, Privinvest grouped its German shipyards under the umbrella of the German Naval Yards Holdings. The group explained this name with its focus on naval shipbuilding and the complete takeover of ownership of the three yards by Privinvest.

Current Issues
Currently, two MEKO A200 frigates are constructed at the GNYH shipyards, a super-yacht, as well as an offshore-platform (as of April 2015).

In May 2015 it was announced that GNYH will build four corvettes for Israel together with ThyssenKrupp Marine Systems.

References

External links
 Web page German Naval Yards Kiel 
 Web page Nobiskrug
 Web page Lindenau

Companies based in Kiel
Shipbuilding companies of Germany
Defence companies of Germany